Bias in the introduction of variation ("arrival bias") refers to a theory in the domain of evolutionary biology that asserts biases in the introduction of heritable variation are reflected in the outcome of evolution. It is relevant to topics in molecular evolution, evo-devo, and self-organization. In the context of this theory, "introduction" ("origination") is a technical term for events that shift an allele frequency upward from zero (mutation is the genetic process that converts one allele to another, whereas introduction is the population genetic process that adds to the set of alleles in a population with non-zero frequencies). 
Formal models demonstrate that when an evolutionary process depends on introduction events, mutational and developmental biases in the generation of variation may influence the course of evolution by a first come, first served effect, so that evolution reflects the arrival of the fitter, not just the survival of the fitter.
Whereas mutational explanations for evolutionary patterns are traditionally associated with neutral evolution, the theory of arrival biases distinctively predicts that biases in the generation of variation may shape adaptive change. 
The most direct evidence for this kind of cause-effect relationship comes from laboratory studies showing that adaptive changes are systematically enriched for mutationally likely types of changes.
Retrospective analyses of natural cases of adaptation also provide support for the theory.
This theory is notable as an example of contemporary internalist thinking, contrasting with a classical externalist view in which the course of evolution is determined by natural selection.

History 

The theory of biases in the introduction process as a cause of orientation or direction in evolution has been explained as the convergence of two threads.  The first, from theoretical population genetics, is the recognition (toward the end of the 20th century) that a correct treatment of evolutionary dynamics requires a rate-dependent process of introduction (origination) missing from classical treatments of evolution as a process of shifting frequencies of available alleles. This recognition is evident in the development and application of origin-fixation models, which treat evolution as a 2-step process of origination and fixation (by drift or selection), with a rate specified by multiplying a rate of introduction (based on the mutation rate) with a probability of fixation (based on the effect on fitness). Origin-fixation models (for review, see ) appeared in 1969, in the midst of the molecular revolution, a half-century after the origins of theoretical population genetics: they were soon widely applied in neutral models for rates and patterns of molecular evolution; their use in models of molecular adaptation was popularized in the 1990s; by 2014 they were described as a major branch of formal theory.

The second thread is a long history of attempts to establish that mutation and development exert a dispositional influence on evolution by presenting options for subsequent functional evaluation, i.e., acting in a manner that is logically prior to selection. In the early 20th-century, authors such as Eimer or Cope held that development constrains or channels evolution so strongly that the effect of selection is of secondary importance. 

Many evolutionary thinkers have argued that evolution exhibits tendencies that reflect internal generative tendencies, e.g., early geneticists such as Morgan and Punnett proposed that common parallelisms (e.g., involving melanism or albinism) may reflect mutationally likely changes.
Expanding on Vavilov's (1922)  exploration of this theme, Spurway (1949)
 
wrote that "the mutation spectrum of a group may be more important than many of its morphological or physiological features."

Similar thinking featured in the emergence of evo-devo, e.g., Alberch (1980) suggests that "in evolution, selection may decide the winner of a given game but development non-randomly defines the players" (p. 665) (see also ). 
Thomson (1985),

reviewing multiple volumes addressing the new developmentalist thinking— a book by Raff and Kaufman (1983)

and conference volumes edited by Bonner (1982)
 
and Goodwin, et al (1983) 

—
wrote that "The whole thrust of the developmentalist approach to evolution is to explore the possibility that asymmetries in the introduction of variation at the focal level of individual phenotypes, arising from the inherent properties of developing systems, constitutes a powerful source of causation in evolutionary change" (p. 222). Likewise, the paleontologists Elisabeth Vrba and Niles Eldredge summarized this new developmentalist thinking by saying that "bias in the introduction of phenotypic variation may be more important to directional phenotypic evolution than sorting by selection." 

This internalist thesis was repeatedly rejected based on claims about the nature and locale of evolutionary causation, e.g., by Maynard Smith ("If we are to understand evolution, we must remember that it is a process which occurs in populations, not in individuals.")

and by Wallace ("problems concerned with the orderly development of the individual are unrelated to those of the evolution of organisms through time"),

In the view that prevailed at the time, the causes of evolution are "forces" that act as mass pressures (i.e., the aggregate effects of countless individual events) shifting allele frequencies in populations (see Ch. 4 of ), thus development did not qualify as an evolutionary cause. A widely cited 1985 commentary on "developmental constraints"  advocated the importance of developmental influences, but did not anchor this claim with a population-genetic theory of causation, a deficiency noted by critics, e.g., Reeve and Sherman (1993) defended the adaptationist program (against the developmentalists and the famous critique of adaptationism by Gould and Lewontin), arguing that the "developmental constraints" argument simply restates the idea that development shapes variation, without explaining how such preferences prevail against the pressure of selection. 
Mayr (1994)

insisted that developmentalist thinking was "hopelessly mixed up" because development is a proximate cause and not an evolutionary one. 
In this way, the developmentalist thesis was received in the 1980s and 1990s as speculation without a rigorous grounding, an attitude that persists (e.g., Lynch, 2007 ).

The response of developmentalists to these rebukes— indicating that a dispositional role for development conflicted with prevailing views of causation— was to conclude that population genetics provides an incomplete account of evolutionary causation:

a complete version would require, not merely a dry statistical account of changes in gene frequencies, but also an alternative narrative, a wet biological account of changes in developmental-genetic organization (called "lineage explanation" in
). 
The beliefs that (1) developmental biology was never integrated into the Modern Synthesis and (2) population genetics must be supplemented with alternative narratives of developmental causation, are now widely repeated in the evo-devo literature and are given explicitly as motivations for reform via an Extended Evolutionary Synthesis.

Yampolsky and Stoltzfus (2001) proposed a different causal grounding for the internalist thesis, based on recognizing the introduction process formally as an evolutionary cause subject to mutational and developmental biases.  Under this proposal, the key to understanding the internalist thesis was a previously missing population-genetic theory for the consequences of biases in introduction. The authors criticized classical reasoning for framing the evolutionary efficacy of variational tendencies as a question of evolution by mutation pressure, i.e., the transformation of populations by recurrent mutation: if generative biases are important, this cannot be because they out-compete selection as frequency-shifting forces, but because they act prior to selection, via introduction. Thus the theory of arrival biases proposes that the generative dispositions of a developmental-genetic system (i.e., its tendencies to respond to genetic perturbation in preferential ways) shape evolution by mediating biases in introduction. The theory, which applies to both mutational and developmental biases, addresses how such preferences can be effective in shaping the course of evolution even while strong selection is at work.

Systematic evidence for predicted effects of introduction biases first began to appear from experimental studies of adaptation in bacteria and viruses.

Since 2017, this support has widened to include systematic quantitative results from laboratory adaptation, and similar but less extensive results from the retrospective analysis of natural adaptations traced to the molecular level (see below).  

The empirical case that biases in mutation shape adaptation is considered to be established for practical purposes such as evolutionary forecasting (e.g., 
).
However, the implications of the theory have not been tested critically in regard to morphological and behavioral traits in animals and plants that are the traditional targets of evolutionary theorizing (see Ch. 9 of ). Thus, the relevance of the theory to molecular adaptation has been established, but the significance for evo-devo remains unclear. 
The theory sometimes appears associated with calls for reform from advocates of evo-devo (e.g.,), though it has not yet appeared in textbooks or in broad treatments of challenges in evolutionary biology (e.g.,).

Simple model 

The kind of dual causation proposed by the theory has been explained with the analogy of "Climbing Mount Probable." Imagine a robot on a rugged mountain landscape, climbing by a stochastic 2-step process of proposal and acceptance. In the proposal step, the robot reaches out with its limbs to sample various hand-holds, and in the acceptance step, the robot commits and shifts its position. If the acceptance step is biased to favor higher hand-holds, the climber will ascend. But one also may imagine a bias in the proposal step, e.g., the robot may sample more hand-holds on the left than on the right. Then the dual proposal-acceptance process will show both an upward bias due to a bias in acceptance, and a leftward bias due to a bias in proposal. 

If the landscape is rugged, the ascent will end on a local peak that (due to the proposal bias) will tend to be to the left of the starting point. On a perfectly smooth landscape, the climber will simply spiral to the left until the single global peak is reached.
In either case, the trajectory of the climber is subject to a dual bias. These two biases are not pressures competing to determine an allele frequency: they act at different steps, along non-identical dimensions.
 

The dual effect predicted by the theory was demonstrated originally with a population-genetic model of a 1-step adaptive walk with 2 options, i.e., the climber faces two upward choices, one with a higher selection coefficient and the other with a higher mutation rate. A key feature of model is that neither of the alternatives is present in the initial population: they must be introduced. In simulated adaptation under this model, the population frequently reaches fixation for the mutationally favored allele, even though it is not the most fit option. The form of the model is agnostic with respect to whether the biases are mutational or developmental.  Subsequent theoretical work (below) has generalized on the theory of one-step walks, and also considered longer-term adaptive walks on complex fitness landscapes. The general implication for parallel evolution is that biases in introduction may contribute strongly to parallelism. The general implication for the directionality and repeatability of adaptive walks is simply that some paths are more evolutionarily favorable due to being mutationally favorable. The general implication for the long-term predictability of outcomes, e.g., particular phenotypes, is that some phenotypes are more findable than others due to mutational effects, and such effects may strongly shape the distribution of evolved phenotypes.

The application of the theory to problems in evo-devo and self-organization relies formally on the concept of a genotype-phenotype (GP) map. The genetic code, for example, is a GP map that induces asymmetries in mutationally accessible phenotypes. Consider evolution from the Met (amino acid) phenotype encoded by the ATG (codon) genotype. A phenotypic shift from Met to Val requires an ATG to GTG mutation; a shift from Met to Leu can occur by 2 different mutations (ATG to CTG or TTG); a shift from Met to Ile can occur by 3 different mutations (to ATT, ATC, or ATA). If each type of genetic mutation has the same rate, i.e., with no mutation bias per se, the GP map induces 3 different rates of introduction of the alternative phenotypes Val, Leu and Ile. Due to this bias in introduction, evolution from Met to Ile is favored, and this is not due to a mutational bias (in the sense of a bias reflecting the mechanisms of mutagenesis), but rather an asymmetric mapping of phenotypes to mutationally accessible genotypes.

Results of theoretical modeling

One-step adaptive walks 

As noted above, in the simplest case of the "Climbing Mount Probable" effect, one may consider a climber facing just two fixed choices: up and to the left, or up and to the right. This case is modeled using simulations by

, and is given a more complete treatment by 

.  

For 1-step walks under origin-fixation conditions, the behavior given by Eqn generalizes from 2 to many alternatives. For instance, Cano, et al. (2022)

consider a model gene with many different beneficial mutations, and under low mutation supply, the effects of mutation bias are proportional on the spectrum of adaptive changes.

When  is not very small, different beneficial alleles may be present simultaneously, competing and slowing down adaptation, an effect known as clonal interference. Clonal interference reduces the effect of mutation bias in models of evolution in finite genetic spaces: alleles favored by mutation still tend to arrive sooner, but before they reach fixation, later-arising alleles that are more beneficial can out-compete them, enhancing the effect of fitness differences. Under the most extreme condition when all possible beneficial alleles are reliably present in a large population, the most fit allele wins deterministically and there is no room for an effect of mutation bias. Stated differently, when all the beneficial alleles are present and selection determines the winner, the chance of success is 1 for the most fit allele, and 0 for all other alleles. Thus, in a gene model with a finite set of beneficial mutations, the influence of mutation bias is expected to be strongest when  but to fall off as  becomes large.

The influence of mutation under varying degrees of clonal interference can be quantified precisely using the regression method of Cano, et al (2022).

Taking the logarithm of this equation gives

where  is the logarithm of the constant of proportionality. Thus, when  is unknown, it may be estimated as the coefficient for the regression of log(counts) on log(expected counts). Simulations of a gene model (figure at right from ) show a range from  under high mutation supply to  when the mutation supply is low. While this approach was developed to assess how the mutation spectrum influenced adaptive missense changes (defined by a starting codon and an ending amino acid), the equation reflects a generic framework applicable to any mutationally defined classes of change.

Note that these considerations apply to finite genetic spaces. In an infinite genetic space, clonal interference still slows down the rate of adaptation due to competition, but it does not prevent an effect of mutation bias because there are always mutationally favored alternative alleles among the most-fit class of alleles.

Contribution of mutation to parallelism 

In general, if there is some set of possible steps each with a probability , then the chance of parallelism is given by summing the squares, .

This result validates the intuition of Shull

that "It strains one's faith in the laws of chance to imagine that identical changes should crop out again and again if the possibilities are endless and the probabilities equal" (p. 448). To the extent that heterogeneity in  reflects heterogeneity in mutational chances, mutation contributes to parallelism.

Under origin-fixation conditions, and assuming , it follows that 

Numeric examples in Box 2 of  suggest that mutation sometimes contributes more to parallelism than selection, although the authors note that  in the denominator above confounds effects of mutation and selection in a hidden way (because, in practice,  reflects the set of paths that are sufficiently favored by selection and sufficiently mutationally likely to be observed).

Longer-term effects: trends, navigability, and findability 

For a systematic view of long-term effects of evolution in discrete genotypic space, consider the 4 perspectives below, focusing on the influence of a mutation spectrum (characteristic for some evolving system) on various ways of defining the chances of evolution (following the treatment by ):
 A point  with access to other nearby points in genotype space. From , there are 0 or more upward steps or paths that differ in mutational favorability (as a function of the mutation spectrum) and fitness benefits. The evolvability-from- is a function of this set of steps. Under simple conditions, each step has a probability  and the repeatability of evolution is derived by squaring the  values. 
 The non-empty set of steps in a path or traverse of increasing fitness, i.e., an adaptive path (one could also consider a neutral path or a path of non-decreasing fitness). Each path has a length and a composition in terms of fitness benefits of steps, and the mutational favorability of steps. The likelihood that evolution follows a given path must depend in some way on these properties, in relation to other possible paths. 
 The aggregated set of paths (the "basin of attraction") that lead to a given destination such as a peak or plateau of fitness, or the set of steps into a phenotypic network.  Any destination is discoverable via 0 or more upward paths that connect it with lower points. The points in this collection may also have paths to other destinations. For a given destination, the evolvability-to or findability depends on this collection of paths relative to competing paths. Each collection has some total size, i.e., there may be many or few paths leading to a destination.  
 A fitness landscape that may include many peaks and paths. Depending on its collection of peaks and paths, a landscape may be more or less navigable, in the sense of having a high chance of finding a peak of high fitness from a randomly chosen starting point. The navigability of a landscape will depend on the mutation spectrum in relation to the composition of paths in the landscape.

Theoretical results relating to each of these perspectives are available. 

For instance, in a simulation of adaptive walks of protein-coding genes in the context of an abstract NK landscape, the effect of a GC-AT mutation bias is to alter the protein sequence composition in a manner qualitatively consistent with the analogy of Climbing Mount Probable (above). Each adaptive walk begins with a random sequence and ends on some local peak; the direction of the walk and the final peak depend on the mutation bias. For instance, adaptive walks under a mutation bias toward GC result in proteins that have more of the amino acids with GC-rich codons (Gly, Ala, Arg, Pro), and likewise, adaptive walks under AT bias result in proteins with more of the amino acids with AT-rich codons (Phe, Tyr, Met, Ile, Asn, Lys).  On a rough landscape, the initial effect is similar, but the adaptive walks are shorter. That is, the mutation bias imposes a preference (on the adaptive walks) for steps, paths, and local peaks that are enriched in outcomes favored by the mutation bias. This illustrates the concept of a directional trend in which the system moves cumulatively in a particular direction along an axis of composition.

The influence of transition-transversion bias has been explored using empirical fitness landscapes for transcription factor binding sites.

Each landscape is based on generating thousands of different 8-nucleotide fragments and measuring how well they bind to a particular transcription factor. Each peak on each landscape is accessible by some set of paths made of steps that are nucleotide changes, each one being either a transition or a transversion.  Among all possible genetic changes, the ratio of transitions to transversions is 1:2. However, the collection of paths leading to a given peak (on a given empirical landscape) has a specific transition-transversion composition that may differ from 1:2. Likewise, any evolving system has a particular transition-transversion bias in mutation.  The more closely the mutation bias (of the evolving system) matches the composition bias (of the landscape), the more likely that the evolving system will find the peak. 
Thus, for a given evolving system with its characteristic transition-transversion bias, some landscapes are more navigable than others. Navigability is maximized when the mutation bias of the evolving system matches the composition bias of the landscape.

Finally, rather than organizing genotypes by fitness (in terms of peaks, upward paths, and collections of paths leading to a peak), we can organize genotypes by phenotype using a genotype–phenotype map. A given phenotype identifies a network in genotype-space including all of the genotypes with that phenotype. An evolving system may diffuse neutrally within the network of genotypes with the same phenotype, but conversions between phenotypes are assumed to be non-neutral. Each phenotypically defined network has a findability that is, as a first approximation, a function of the number of genotypes in the network.

For instance, using the canonical genetic code as a genotype-phenotype map, the phenotype Leucine has 6 codons whereas Tryptophan has 1: Leucine is more findable because there are more mutational paths from non-Leucine genotypes. This idea can be applied to the way that RNA folds (considered as phenotypes) map to RNA sequences. For instance, evolutionary simulations show that the RNA folds with more sequences are more findable, and this is due to the way that they are over-sampled by mutation. A similar point has been made in regard to substructures of regulatory networks  (see also ).

The above results apply, as before, to finite spaces. In infinite spaces, the set of remaining beneficial mutations to be explored is infinite and includes an infinite supply of mutationally favored and mutationally disfavored options. Therefore evolution in infinite spaces can continue forever in the mutationally favored direction with no diminution of the mutational effect that applies in the short-term, e.g., one could consider Eqn for such an infinite space.  The model of Gomez, et al (2020)  allows unlimited adaptation via two traits, one with a higher rate of beneficial mutation, and the other with larger selective benefits. In this model, mutation bias continues to be important in long-term evolution even when mutation supply is very high.

Distinctive implications 

The theory of biases in the introduction process as a cause of orientation or direction in evolution may be contrasted with other theories that have been used by evolutionary biologists to reason about the role of variation in evolution: 
 Organisms respond adaptively to conditions of life, and these responses are inherited (Lamarckism). This theory is generally considered to lack a mechanistic basis. 
 Variation supplies raw material shaped into adaptations by selection (neo-Darwinism). In this theory, "selection is the only direction-giving factor in evolution", while variation is a material cause— merely a passive source of substance, not a source of form, initiative, or direction (supplied by selection)—, so that the laws of variation "bear no relation" to the structures built by selection.
 Development imposes prior constraints on form. In this folk theory, "selection may decide the winner of a given game but development non-randomly defines the players." This theory appeared in classic arguments from authors such as Eimer and Cope; it re-emerged in developmentalist claims of the 1980s. 
 Mass conversion by mutation pressure transforms a population. The implications of this mode of causation were worked out mainly by Haldane  and Kimura, who found it implausible due to requiring high mutation rates unopposed by selection
 The amount of standing variation enhances or retards selection-driven shifts in quantitative characters. In evolutionary quantitative genetics, the  matrix (standing variation) is a source of dimensional but not directional asymmetry, depending on the amount of variation available along any given dimension in trait-space.

Note that these theories are not all precisely comparable. In particular, in evolutionary quantitative genetics, or in classical Modern Synthesis thinking, one's thinking about the role of variation tends to begin with a description of standing variation, whereas the focus in much of the literature of evo-devo and molecular evolution is on generative processes that modify organisms, i.e., the process of varigenesis.

Relative to these theories, the theory of arrival biases has distinctive implications, some of which are supported empirically as described below, e.g., the most frequent outcome of an adaptive process such as the emergence of antibiotic resistance is not necessarily the most beneficial, but is often a moderately beneficial outcome favored by a high rate of mutational origin. Likewise, the theory implies that evolution can have directions that are not adaptive, or tendencies that are not optimal, an implication one commentator on Arthur's book
found "disturbing". 
This theory is defined, not by any particular problem, taxon, level of organization, or field of study, but by a mechanism defined at the level of population genetics, namely the ability of biases in introduction to impose biases on evolution. 

Some implications are as follows (see ).

Effects do not require neutrality or high mutation rates. In contrast to the theory of evolution by mutation pressure explored (and rejected) by Haldane and others, variational dispositions under the theory of arrival biases do not depend on neutral evolution and do not require high mutation rates.

Graduated biases can have graduated effects. In contrast to what is implied by the language of "constraints" or "limits" employed in historic appeals to internal sources of direction in evolution, the theory of arrival biases is not deterministic and does not require an absolute distinction between possible and impossible forms. Instead, the theory is probabilistic, and graduated biases can have graduated effects.

Regime-dependency with regard to population genetics.  Under the theory, variation biases do not have a guaranteed effect independent of the details of population-genetics. The influence of mutation biases reaches a maximum (proportional influence) under origin-fixation conditions and can disappear almost entirely under high levels of mutation supply.

Parity in fixation biases and origination biases (under limiting conditions).  In classical neo-Darwinian thinking, selection governs and shapes evolution, whereas variation plays a passive role of supplying materials. By contrast, under limiting origin-fixation conditions, the theory of arrival biases establishes a condition of parity such that (for instance) a 2-fold bias in fixation and a 2-fold bias in introduction both have the same 2-fold effect on the chances of evolution.

Generality with regard to sources of variational bias. In the evolutionary literature, mutation biases, developmental "constraints", and self-organization in the sense of findability are all treated as separate topics. Under the theory of arrival biases, these are all manifestations of the same kind of population-genetic mechanism in which biases in the introduction of variants imposes biases on evolution. Any short-term bias is either a mutational bias in the sense of a difference in rates for two fully specified genotypic conversions, or it can be treated as a scheme of differential phenotypic aggregation over genotypes (see Box 2 of ).

In addition to these direct implications, some more sophisticated or indirect implications have emerged in the literature.

Non-causal associations induced by mutation and selection. Due to a dual dependence on mutation and selection, the distribution of adaptive changes may show non-causal associations of mutation rates and selection coefficients, somewhat akin to Berkson's paradox, as suggested in Ch. 8 of. 

This is a distinctive implication of the theory because of the way it relies on the graduated effect of arrival biases.

Conditions for composition and decomposition of causes.  Under limiting origin-fixation conditions, the chances of evolution reflect two factors multiplied together, representing biases in introduction and biases in fixation, as in Eqn.  Thus, conditions exist under which it is possible to quantify and directly compare the dispositional influences of mutation and selection. This approach has already been used in a few empirical arguments addressed below. (Box 2 of ).

Biased depletion of the spectrum of beneficial mutations.  In any case of a system adapting via mutation and selection, there is some set of possible beneficial mutations, characterized by a distribution of selection coefficients and mutation rates.  As adaptation occurs in a mutation-biased manner, this spectrum of possible beneficial mutations is depleted in a biased way. The theory for this depletion  is relevant to experimental work showing that "shifts in mutation spectra enhance access to beneficial mutations". That is, the experimentally observed favorability of shifts in mutation spectra depends on a pattern of biased depletion of beneficial mutations that is itself a sign of mutation-biased adaptation.

Evidence 

Evidence for the theory has been summarized recently, e.g., Gomez, et al (2020)  present a table listing 8 different studies providing evidence of effect of mutation bias on adaptation, and Ch. 9 of Mutation, Randomness and Evolution  is devoted to empirical support for the theory (see also ). 
Biases in introduction are expected to influence evolution whether neutral or adaptive, but an effect on neutral evolution is not considered intuitively surprising or controversial, and so is not given much attention. Instead, accounts of evidence focus on mutation-biased adaptation, because this highlights how predictions of the theory clash with the classical conception of mutation as a weak pressure easily overcome by selection, per the "opposing pressures" argument of Fisher and Haldane.

Direct evidence of causation under controlled conditions 

Direct evidence that the spectrum of mutation shapes the spectrum of adaptive changes comes from studies that manipulate the mutation spectrum directly.  In one study, resistance to cefotaxime was evolved repeatedly, using 3 strains of E. coli with different mutation spectra: wild-type, mutH and mutT. The spectrum of resistance mutations among the evolved strains showed the same patterns of spontaneous mutations as the parental strains. Specifically, the  transversions favored by mutT (left block of bars) are highly enriched among resistant isolates from mutT parents (blue in the accompanying figure), and likewise, the resistant strains from mutH parents (red) tend to have the nucleotide transition mutations favored by mutH (center block of bars).  Thus, changing the mutation spectrum changes the spectrum of adaptive changes in a corresponding manner.

Another study showed that the AR2 strain of P. fluorescens adapted to the loss of motility overwhelmingly (> 95% of the time) by one specific change, an A289C change in the ntrB gene, while the Pf0-2x strain adapted via diverse changes in several genes. The  pattern in AR2 derivatives was traced to a mutational hotspot.  Because the hotspot behavior was associated mainly with synonymous differences between the two strains, the experimenters were able to use genetic engineering to remove the hotspot from AR2 and add it to Pf0-2x, without changing the encoded amino acid sequence.  This reversed the qualitative pattern of outcomes, so that the modified AR2 (engineered to remove the hotspot) adapted via diverse changes, while the modified Pf0-2x with the engineered hotspot adapted via the A289C change 80% of the time.

Graduated effects 

 
 

A different use of available evidence is to focus on the idea of graduated effects, which distinguishes the theory of arrival biases from the intuitive notion of "constraints" or "limits" on possible forms. In particular, one may set aside the dramatic effects associated with hotspots and mutator alleles, and consider the effects of ordinary quantitative biases in nucleotide mutations. A number of studies have established that modest several-fold biases in mutation can have a several-fold effect on evolution, and some studies indicate a roughly proportional relation between mutation rates and the chances of an adaptive change.

For instance, Sackman, et al (2017) studied parallel evolution in 4 related bacteriophages. In each case, they adapted 20 cultures in parallel, then sequenced a sample of the adapted culture to identify causative mutations.  The results showed a strong preference for nucleotide transitions, 29:5 for paths (white vs. black bars in the figure at right) and 74:6 for events.

In a study of resistance to Rifampicin in Pseudomonas aeruginosa, MacLean, et al (2010)

measured selection coefficients and frequency of evolution for 35 resistance mutations in the rpoB (RNA polymerase) gene, and reported mutation rates for 11 of these. The mutation rates vary over a 30-fold range. The frequency with which a resistant variant appears in the set of 284 replicate cultures correlates strongly and roughly linearly with the mutation rate (figure at right). This is not explained by a correlation between selection coefficients and mutation rates, which are not correlated (see Ch. 9 of ).

As explained above, the influence of the mutation spectrum on the spectrum of adaptive changes can be captured in a single parameter , defined as a coefficient of binomial regression of observed counts on the expected counts from a mutational model. Based on theoretical considerations, expected values of  range from 0 (no influence) to 1 (proportional influence).  This method was applied by Cano, et al. to 3 large data sets of adaptive changes, comparing a model based on independent measures of the mutation spectrum with adaptive changes previously identified in studies of (1) clinical antibiotic resistance of Mycobacterium tuberculosis, (2) laboratory adaptation in E. coli, and (3) laboratory adaptation of the yeast Saccharomyces cerevisiae to environmental stress. In each case, indicating a roughly proportional influence of mutation bias. The authors report that this is not just due to the influence of transition-transversion bias, because  applies both to transition-transversion bias and to the other aspects of the nucleotide mutation spectrum.

Scope of applicability 

A final use of available evidence is to consider the range of natural conditions under which the theory may be relevant. Whereas laboratory studies can be used to establish causation and assess effect-sizes, they do not provide direct guidance to where the theory applies in nature. As noted in, most studies of adaptation do not include a genetic analysis that identifies specific mutations, and in the rare cases in which an attempt is made to identify causative mutations, the results typically implicate only very small numbers of changes that are subject to questions of interpretation.
Therefore, the strategy followed in key studies
 has been to focus on trusted cases of adaptation in which the proposed functional effects of putative adaptive mutations have been verified using techniques of genetics.

Payne, et al  looked for an effect of transition bias among causative mutations for antibiotic resistance in clinically identified strains of Mycobacterium tuberculosis, which exhibits a strong mutation bias toward nucleotide transitions.
 
They compared the observed transition-transversion ratio to the 1:2 null expectation under the absence of mutation bias.  Using two different curated databases, they found transition:transversion ratios of
1755:1020 and 1771:900, i.e., enrichments 3.4-fold and 3.9-fold over the null, respectively. 

They also took advantage of the special case of Met-to-Ile replacements, which can take place by 1 transition (ATG to ATA) or 2 different transversions (ATG to ATT or ATC). This 1:2 ratio of possibilities again represents a null expectation for effects independent of mutation bias.  In fact, the mutations in resistant isolates have transition-transversion ratios of 88:49 and 96:39 (for the 2 datasets), i.e., 3.6-fold and 4.9-fold above null expectations. This result cannot be due to selection at the amino acid level, because the changes are all Met to Ile. The significance of this result is not that mutation bias only works when the options are selectively indistinguishable: instead, the lesson is that the bias toward nucleotide transitions is roughly 4-fold both for the Met-to-Ile case, and for amino-acid-changing substitutions generally.

A much broader taxonomic scope is implicated in a meta-analysis of published studies of parallel adaptation in nature. In this study, the authors curated a data set covering 10 published cases of parallel adaptation traced to the molecular level, including well known cases involving spectral tuning, resistance to natural toxins such as cardiac glycosides

and tetrodotoxin, 

 
foregut fermentation, and so on.  
The results shown below (table) indicate a transition-transversion ratio of 132:99, a 2.7-fold enrichment relative to the null expectation of 1:2 (the ratio of paths, which is less sensitive to extreme values, is 27:28, a 2-fold enrichment). 
Thus, this study shows that a bias toward transitions is observed in well known cases of parallel adaptation in diverse taxa, including animals and plants.

 
Finally, Storz, et al. analyzed changes in hemoglobin affinity associated with altitude adaptation in birds. Specifically, they studied the effect of CpG bias, an enhanced mutation rate at CpG sites due to effects of cytosine methylation on damage and repair, found widely in mammals and birds.

They assembled a data set consisting of 35 matched pairs of high- and low-altitude bird species.  In each case, hemoglobins were evaluated for functional differences resulting in a higher oxygen affinity in the high-altitude species. The changes in affinity plausibly linked to adaptation implicated 10 different paths found a total of 22 different times. Six of the 10 paths involved CpG mutations, whereas only 1 would be expected by chance; and 10 out of 22 events involved CpG mutations, whereas only 2 would be expected by chance (both differences were significant). This enrichment of mutationally-likely genetic changes supports the theory of arrival biases and provides further evidence that predictable effects of mutation bias are important for understanding adaptation in nature.

Context in evolutionary thinking 

The theory of arrival bias has been described 

as a cross-cutting theory that specifies a possible causal grounding (in population genetics) for diverse kinds of pre-existing claims for which a causal grounding is either unknown or mis-specified, 
 the internalist-developmentalist thesis (above) that evolutionary dispositions may emerge from the way development shapes variation, acting prior to selection (e.g.,)
 a variety of claims in the molecular evolution literature for genome-wide effects (e.g., on codon usage) ascribed to unequal or directional "mutation pressure"  that are not plausibly explained as evolution by mutation pressure, suggesting instead the need for a theory of genome-wide biases in introduction; 
 the suggestion emerging from the paleobiology debate of the 1980s that, in the hierarchical expansion of evolutionary causation from the population level to multiple levels (i.e., populations, species, higher taxa), speciation is an important source of introduction biases at the level of higher taxa; 
 claims to the effect that evolution tends to find phenotypes over-represented in genotype space, i.e., a "findability" or "arrival of the frequent" effect that can be recognized both in certain arguments from the molecular evolution literature, e.g., King's (1971)  explanation for amino acid frequencies, and from the evolutionary self-organization literature, e.g., the arguments of Kauffman

The general context for applying the theory of arrival biases is illustrated in the figure at right. On the left are the details of mutation and development that are responsible for any tendencies in the generation of variation (varigenesis), i.e., tendencies prior to selection or drift.  On the right are observable evolutionary patterns that might possibly be explained by these tendencies.  The green arrow is some theory— the theory of arrival biases or some alternative theory— that specifies conditions of a cause-effect relationship linking variational tendencies to evolutionary tendencies. To apply a theory in this context is to generate evolutionary hypotheses or explanations that appeal to the internal details of mutation and development (on the left) to account for evolutionary patterns (on the right) via the conditions of causation specified by the theory. For instance, Darwin's comment that the laws of variation "bear no relation" to the structures built by selection would suggest that there are no conditions under which the internal details on the left account for the patterns on the right. The other theories all suggest that variational tendencies may influence evolution under some conditions. For instance, the theory of mutation pressure applies when mutation rates are high and unopposed by selection, thus it has a limited range of applications. The theory of evolutionary quantitative genetics can be applied very broadly to the evolution of quantitative characters, but the theory (as developed so far) does not suggest that mutation biases will have much impact.

By contrast, the theory of arrival bias might apply broadly, and allows for a strong role for variational tendencies in shaping evolutionary tendencies.

Contrast with the classic thinking about causation 

The architects of the Modern Synthesis promoted a particular view of evolution from standing variation, intended to exclude a mutationist conception of evolution based on new mutations (the view of mutation proposes, selection disposes).
 

The dynamics of long-term evolution were assumed to follow from a short-term process of shifting frequencies of available alleles.

Thus, classical mathematical theories focused on the short-term fate of available variation, which is not much affected by mutation rates due to their smallness, e.g., Edwards (1977)  addressed theoretical population genetics without considering mutation at all; Lewontin (1974)  stated that "There is virtually no qualitative or gross quantitative conclusion about the genetic structure of populations in deterministic theory that is sensitive to small values of migration, or any that depends on mutation rates" (p. 267).  The importance of this shifting-gene-frequencies theory is illustrated by a US white paper endorsed by SSE, SMBE, ASN, ESA and other relevant professional societies, in which Futuyma, et al (2001)

state, as fact, that evolution is shifting gene frequencies, identifying the main causes of "evolution" (so defined) as selection and drift (figure).

This conception of evolution as shifting gene frequencies invited a particular view of evolutionary causes as population-level forces that shift frequencies. Larger frequency-shifting forces are more important; selection is the strongest force and so it dominates evolution. In particular, when Haldane and Fisher  asked whether internal tendencies of variation could influence evolution, they framed this as a matter of the efficacy of mutation pressure (see below). They concluded that mutation would be important only in the case of high mutation rates unopposed by selection; the observed smallness of mutation rates means that the course taken by evolution will not reflect mutational tendencies. Seventy years later Gould (2002), citing Fisher (1930), wrote that “Since orthogenesis can only operate when mutation pressure becomes high enough to act as an agent of evolutionary change, empirical data on low mutation rates sound the death-knell of internalism.” (p. 510) 

Thus, through most of the 20th century, while theoreticians focused on frequency-shifting forces, the influence of biases in introduction remained an unsolved theoretical problem, e.g., when Maynard Smith, et al (1985) addressed a possible causal grounding for "developmental constraints", they cited the Haldane-Fisher argument as a barrier to recognizing a causal status for developmental biases in variation, and even noted that this conclusion "deserves re-examination", but did not explain how to overcome this barrier with a theory of introduction biases.

However, toward the end of the 20th century, theoreticians began to note that long-term dynamics depend on events of mutational introduction not covered in classical theory.
In the recent literature, the assumption of evolution from standing variation is only rarely made explicit, e.g., 

.
More commonly, evolution from standing variation is presented as an option to be considered together with evolution from new mutations. 

The importance of arrival biases conflicts with the "forces" view of causation based on evolution from standing variation. That is, under the forces theory, mutation is a weak force unable to influence the course of evolution except via abnormally large mutation rates unopposed by selection, as argued by Haldane and Fisher. This is the correct application of the forces theory, but it only works for evolution from standing variation, and yields incorrect conclusions when evolution depends on new mutations.  In a broader conception of evolution, the processes that cause introduction and the processes that cause fixation both have potential roles as dispositional causes.

Relevance to contemporary issues 

Parallelism and predictability.  The application of the theory to parallelism is addressed above. The tendency for particular outcomes to recur in evolution is not merely a function of selection, but also reflects biases in introduction due to differential accessibility by mutation (or, for the case of phenotypes, by mutation and altered development).  A recent commentary on prediction  applies the theory to the role of mutation biases and selection in contributing to the repeatability of evolution.

Partitioning causal responsibility for patterns to mutation and selection.  In the case of origin-fixation dynamics, evolutionary dispositions can be attributed to a combination of mutation and selection, and it is possible, in principle, to untangle these contributions, as in an analysis of regulatory vs. structural effects in evolution or patterns of amino acid replacement in protein evolution.

Evo-devo, GP maps, and findability.  The application of the theory of arrival biases to development and phenotypes is mediated by the concept of a genotype-phenotype map. A simple example of a biased induced by a GP map is shown at right. From the starting genotype encoding phenotype P0, there are mutations leading to genotypes encoding P1 and P2. However, the number of mutations leading to genotypes encoding P2 is 4 times higher. This is intended to illustrate the idea that, for a given developmental-genetic system, some phenotypes are more likely than others to arise from genetic perturbation. This is not the same thing as a mutation bias per se (an asymmetry caused by the details of mutagenesis), but it can have the same effect in a population-genetic model. In this case, if all mutations happen at the same rate, the total rate of mutational introduction of P1 is 4 times higher than for P2: this bias can be mapped to the Yampolsky-Stoltzfus model and would have the same implications as a 4-fold mutation bias.

For short-term evolution, what matters is the distribution of immediately mutationally accessible phenotypes.  In long-term evolution, however, one may expect two different effects that can be explained by the figure at right, after Fig. 4 of Fontana (2002).
  The networks show the genotypes that map to 3 different phenotypes, P0, P1 and P2. Over time, a system may diffuse neutrally among different genotypes with the same phenotypes. Rarely a jump from one phenotype to another may occur.  In the short term, evolution depends only on what is immediately accessible from a given point in genotype space. In the medium-term, evolution depends on the accessibility of alternative phenotype networks, relative to the starting network, e.g., starting with P0, P2 is twice as accessible as P1, even though P1 and P2 have the same number of genotypes. In the long-term, what matters is the total findability of a phenotype from all other phenotypes, which (as a first approximation) is a matter of the number of genotypes (and more precisely is a matter of the total surface area of the network accessible to other high-fitness phenotypes). In this case, P0 is more findable than P1 and P2 because it has twice as many genotypes.  The variational bias toward more numerous phenotypes is called "phenotype bias" by Dingle, et al (2022)  (see also ).

This effect of findability is the formal basis for empirical and theoretical arguments in studies of the findability of regulatory network motifs or RNA fold families.  In the figure at right, Dingle, et al. (2022) present evidence of a striking tendency for the most common RNA folds in nature to match the folds most widely distributed in sequence space.

Role in broad appeals for reform  

The theory of arrival biases, proposed in 2001, appears in several subsequent appeals for reform, relative to the neo-Darwinian view of the Modern Synthesis. Per Arthur, it is part of a developmentalist approach to evolution that emphasizes the internal organizing effects of "developmental reprogramming" on variation. In a different framing per, the efficacy of arrival biases undermines the historic commitment of theoreticians to viewing evolution as a process of shifting gene frequencies in an abundant gene pool, dominated by mass-action forces, and is part of a larger movement (beginning during the molecular revolution) away from the neo-Darwinism of the Modern Synthesis and towards a version of mutationism grounded in population genetics. The theory also has been invoked in the literature of the Extended Evolutionary Synthesis under the heading of Developmental bias.

Distinction from other theories of mutational effects 

The theory of arrival biases focuses on a kind of population-genetic causation linking intrinsic generative biases acting prior to selection with predictable evolutionary tendencies. It is distinct from other ideas that lack the same focus on causation, on intrinsic biases, or on the introduction process.

Evolution by mutation pressure 

In classic sources, evolution by "mutation pressure" means the mass transformation of a population by mutational conversion, as in Wilson and Bossert (1971, p. 42). The general assessment of this theory, following Haldane (1932)   and Fisher (1930), is that evolution by mutation pressure is implausible because it requires high mutation rates unopposed by selection. Kimura argued even more pessimistically that transformation by mutation pressure would take so long that it can be ignored for practical purposes. Nevertheless, later empirical and theoretical work showed that the theory can be valuable in cases such as the loss of a complex trait encoded by many loci, e.g., loss of sporulation in experimental populations of B. subtilis, a case in which the mutation rate for loss of the trait was estimated as an unusually high value, .

Thus, the theory of evolution by mutation pressure— population transformation by mass mutational conversion— is quite different from the theory of evolutionary biases due to biases in the introduction process, e.g., only the former depends on high mutation rates unopposed by selection.

In general, mutation is often assigned a dual role as a pressure and as a source of novelty. In the theory of causation prevalent in the late 20th century, the first aspect, mutation pressure, is treated formally as an evolutionary cause and contrasted in power with selection and drift as if all of the forces are acting in parallel to shift frequencies, and the second aspect (source of novelty) is treated as a kind of background condition that happens before evolution gets started. By contrast, in the theory of introduction biases, the novelty-introducing role of mutation is foregrounded as a causal process, and the frequency-shifting pressure is generally ignored as being quantitatively unimportant.

Evolution along genetic lines of least resistance 

Evolutionary quantitative genetics, the body of theory that focuses on highly polygenic quantitative traits, makes a particular prediction about mutational effects that has some empirical support. In the standard theory for a set of quantitative traits, the standing variation is represented by a  matrix of variances and covariances, which depends (in a complex way) on mutational input represented by an  matrix. Phenotypic divergence will tend to be aligned (in phenotype space) with the dimension of greatest variation, and this predicted effect of standing variation has been seen repeatedly.   This effect (explained more fully in Developmental bias) is called adaptation "along genetic lines of least resistance" and could be re-stated (with variation in a positive role) as adaptation along lines of maximal variational fuel.

The use of mutation bias in the sense of an asymmetric effect on trait means is not part of the standard framework. When mutation bias is included in models of a single quantitative trait under stabilizing selection, the result is a small displacement from the optimal value.  

Mutational contingency 

Evolutionary explanations have often relied on a paradigm of "equilibrium explanation" (ch. 5 of 
) 
in which outcomes are explained by appeal to what is selectively optimal, without regard to history or details of process
(as explained in 

)
However, attention has focused in recent decades on the idea of "contingency", i.e., the idea that the outcome of evolution cannot be explained as the predictable or predefined endpoint of a deterministic process, but takes some path that cannot be predicted easily, or can only be predicted by knowing details of the starting conditions and the subsequent dynamics. To explain outcomes under contingency, one must specify something about the starting conditions or the subsequent dynamics.  Thus, "contingency" is an explanatory concept defined by negation: to label an outcome as "contingent" is to say that it did not emerge as the reliably predictable endpoint of some process.

More specifically, "mutational contingency" refers to cases in which an event of evolution is associated distinctively with a particular mutation, or a mutational hotspot, e.g.,. Examples of mutational contingency are cases of contingency in which the occurrence of a distinctive mutation is understood to be strongly explanatory for a specific change, in the sense that the evolutionary change would not have happened in the observed manner if the distinctive mutation had not occurred in the manner inferred. Appeals to mutation-order speciation (a kind of non-ecological speciation) represent a kind of appeal to mutational contingency.

This notion differs from the theory of biases in the introduction process because it is an ad hoc explanatory concept and does not specify any population-genetic mechanism or make quantitative predictions: comparing contingency to the theory of arrival bias is like comparing the concept of accidental death to a predictive theory of selection.  Contingency does not refer to a causal theory, but represents a way to assign a meaning post-hoc through a label ("mutational contingency") that carries an explanatory message of non-determinism and mutational dependency. This explanatory message is applied in idiographic explanations, i.e., explaining one-off events (token events),

Developmental constraints (developmental bias) 

The concept of "constraint" is fraught.

Green and Jones (2016) argue that evolutionary biologists use it as a flexible explanatory concept rather than as a way to refer to a specific causal theory, i.e., a constraint is a factor with some limiting influence that makes it predictive, even if the causal basis of this influence is unclear.

A simple notion of developmental constraint is that some phenotypic forms are not observed, due to being impossible (or at least very difficult) to generate developmentally  , e.g., centipedes with an even number of leg-bearing segments. That is, constraint is an explanation for the non-existence of phenotypes based on a variational effect (absence), within a paradigm focused on accounting for patterns of phenotype existence.

Other references to "constraint" imply graduated differences rather than the absolute difference between possible and impossible forms, e.g.,. Whereas the effectiveness of absolute biases does not require a special causal theory (because a developmentally impossible form is an evolutionarily impossible form), the idea of graduated biases prompts questions of causation, due to the conflict with the classic Haldane-Fisher "opposing pressures" argument, which holds that mere variational tendencies are ineffectual because mutation rates are small. The seminal "developmental constraints" paper by Maynard Smith, et al. (1985)  noted this issue without providing a solution. Advocates of "constraint" were criticized for failing to provide a mechanism. This is the issue that Yampolsky and Stoltzfus  sought to remedy.

Nevertheless, the theory of arrival biases cannot be easily mapped to the concept of "constraint" due to the latter being used widely as a synonym for "factor". In the evo-devo literature, the term "constraint" is increasingly replaced with references to developmental bias. However, the concept of developmental bias is often associated with some idea of facilitated variation or evolvability, whereas the theory of arrival biases is only about the population-genetic consequences of arbitrary biases in the generation of variation.

Facilitated variation, evolvability, and directed mutation 

The theory of arrival biases is not about facilitated variation or directed mutation or evolvability. The population-genetic models used to illustrate the theory, and the empirical cases invoked in support of the theory, focus on the consequences of different forms of mutation bias, where the bias is always relative to some dimension other than fitness, e.g., transition-transversion bias, CpG bias, or the asymmetry of two traits with different mutabilities. That is, the theory does not assume that biases are beneficial with respect to fitness, and it does not propose that mutation bias is itself a cause of adaptation, independent of selection (contra 

). In fact, many models illustrate the efficacy of arrival biases by focusing on a case where the most mutationally favored outcomes are not the most fit options, as in the original Yampolsky-Stoltzfus model, where one choice has a higher mutation rate but a smaller fitness benefit, and the other has a higher fitness benefit but a smaller mutation rate. The theory assumes neither that mutationally favored outcomes are more fit, nor that they are less fit.

See also 
Developmental bias
Evolvability
Extended evolutionary synthesis
Mutation bias
Population genetics

References 

Evolutionary biology